KDLF (1260 AM) is a radio station serving the Central Iowa area. The station primarily broadcasts a Hispanic music format. KDLF is licensed to Latin World Broadcasting, Inc. whose main business offices are located at 1541 E. Grand Ave.,  Des Moines, IA. The station is also broadcasting on translator K243CO, 96.5 FM, licensed to Boone, Iowa.

The KDLF antenna system uses a two-tower directional array that concentrates the signal toward the southwest.

Previous logo

External links

DLF
Mass media in Boone, Iowa